The 2018–19 Women's FIH Series Finals were the second stage of the 2018–19 edition of the Hockey Series. It was held in June 2019.

The top two teams from each event qualified for the 2019 FIH Olympic Qualifiers.

Qualification
The following 24 teams, shown with pre-tournament World Rankings as of December 2018, when the pools were composed, qualified for the FIH Series Finals.

Banbridge

The tournament was originally scheduled to take place in Dublin but the venues, where it would be held, would not be finished in time, so the tournament was moved to Banbridge.

All times are local (UTC+1).

First round

Pool A

Pool B

Second round

Cross-overs

Seventh and eighth place

Fifth and sixth place

Semi-finals

Third and fourth place

Final

Final standings

 Qualified for the FIH Olympic Qualifiers

Awards
The following awards were given at the conclusion of the tournament.

Hiroshima

All times are local (UTC+9).

First round

Pool A

Pool B

Second round

Cross-overs

Seventh and eighth place

Fifth and sixth place

Semi-finals

Third and fourth place

Final

Final standings

 Qualified for the FIH Olympic Qualifiers

Awards
The following awards were given at the conclusion of the tournament.

Valencia

All times are local (UTC+2).

First round

Pool A

Pool B

Second round

Cross-overs

Seventh and eighth place

Fifth and sixth place

Semi-finals

Third and fourth place

Final

Final standings

 Qualified for the FIH Olympic Qualifiers

Awards
The following awards were given at the conclusion of the tournament.

Goalscorers

Notes

References

External links
Official website

Finals
International women's field hockey competitions hosted by Ireland
International women's field hockey competitions hosted by Japan
International women's field hockey competitions hosted by Spain
Hockey Series Finals
Hockey Series Finals
Hockey Series Finals